Sabrina Zara Helén Henriksson Benhadj Djillali (born 12 January 1994) is a Swedish footballer defender.

External links 
 
 Profile at Swedish Football Association (SvFF) 

1994 births
Living people
Swedish women's footballers
Mallbackens IF players
Umeå IK players
Damallsvenskan players
Women's association football defenders
Kungsbacka DFF players